Utpal Harivallabh Bhayani (10 October 1953 – 16 October 2019) was a Gujarati language story writer, playwright, critic and translator from Gujarat, India.

Life
Utapal Bhayani was born on 10 October 1953 in Calicut (now Kozhikode) to Harivallabh Bhayani, a Gujarati writer. His family was from Mahuva in Bhavnagar district. He studied Master of Commerce and later qualified as Chartered Accountant which he accepted as his profession. He served as a trustee of Parichay Trust, Mumbai.

He died on 16 October 2019.

Works
Nimajjan (1978) was his first collection of stories followed by Hallo! (1983) which included some experimental stories. Khatavani (1995) was well received by critics. Vahi (2008) was his fourth collection. His story Mijbani was included in Swatantrottar Gujarati Navlika edited by Raghuveer Chaudhari. His Extra Ticket  was anthologized in Ketlik Gujarati Tunki Vartao (1955–80) edited by Gulabdas Broker and Suman Shah.

He was a prolific drama critic but he considered his works as Samiksha not criticism. His drama criticism works starting in 1976 include Drashyafalak (1981), Preksha (1986), Natakno Jeev (1987), Tarjni Sanket (1992), Samajik Natak: Ek Nutan Unmesh (1993), Deshvideshni Rangbhumi (2001), Rangbhumi (2004), Natyadrashti (2003), Natyagoshthi (2004).
Mahabharat (1991) and Sahyog (1999) are translations. He edited Sampark (1982), Adhunik Gujarati Ekankio (1994) and Sureshni Sathe Sathe (2007).

Awards
His story collection Khatvani (1995) was awarded by Gujarati Sahitya Parishad.

See also
 List of Gujarati-language writers

References

1953 births
2019 deaths
Gujarati-language writers
Indian literary critics
Writers from Mumbai
20th-century Indian short story writers
Indian male dramatists and playwrights
20th-century Indian translators
Writers from Kozhikode
20th-century Indian male writers